Patrick Roach (born 1965) is a British trade unionist.

Roach was born in Walsall to parents who had immigrated from Jamaica. He hoped to become a schoolteacher but did not secure the grades to attend university, so went to Matthew Boulton College.  Obtaining higher grades, he was able to study education at the University of Leicester, before becoming a teacher in colleges of further education.   He completed a doctorate in sociology at the University of Warwick, then became a university lecturer in social policy.

In 1998, Roach began working for the NASUWT union, which represents schoolteachers, then in 2010 became the union's deputy general secretary.  From 2017, he also served on the General Council of the Trades Union Congress. In 2020, he became the NASUWT general secretary without facing a contest, as no other candidate received enough nominations to stand.

References

1965 births
Living people
Alumni of the University of Leicester
Alumni of the University of Warwick
General Secretaries of NASUWT
Members of the General Council of the Trades Union Congress
People from Walsall